Uljin County (Uljin-gun; Korean: 울진군) is a county in North Gyeongsang Province, South Korea. Before 1963, Uljin was in Gangwon Province.

It borders the Sea of Japan in the east, Bonghwa-gun and Yeongyang-gun in the west, Yeongdeok-gun in the south, and Samcheok-si, Gangwon-do in the north. It is located at 129°04'∼129°29' east longitude and 36°38'∼37°06' north latitude. The area is 989.43 square kilometers, and the population is 51,885 (as of 2015). There are 2 eups, 8 myeons, and 195 administrative districts (79 Beopjeong-ri). The county office is located in Eupnae-ri, Uljin-eup, Uljin-gun, Gyeongsangbuk-do.

Administrative divisions 

Uljin County is divided into 2 eup and 8 myeon.

Culture and sightseeing

Festivals
Uljin's festivals reflect the county's agricultural and maritime industry.

In 2005 and 2009 for three weeks, Uljin hosted the Uljin Organic Food Exhibition (울진세계친환경농업엑스포) in Uljin's Expo Park. The expo features global representatives of the organic food industry, interactive activities, live music, and food.  The next expo is slated for July 2013.

 Uljin Snow Crab Promotion Exhibition Center

Museums 

 Freshwater Fish Museum
 Hupo-ri Neolithic Historic Museum
 Wonjaryeok Museum 
 Hyangam Museum of Art
 Bongpyeong Silla Stele in Uljin

Parks 

 Gusugok Recreational Forest
 Nagok ocean fishing park
 Expo Park
 Tonggosan Recreational Forest
 Geumgang Pine Forest of Uljin

Villages 

 Giseongri Fishing and Recreation Village
 Nagok1ri Fishing and Recreation Village
 Ssangjeolli Green Village
 Wangpi Georigo Village

Experiences 

 Geoil 1ri Fishing Village Experiences
 Deokgu Spa 
 Sung Ryu Park Hot Spring
 Uljin Science Experience
 'Into The Storm' Drama Set
 Baegam Hot Springs Special Tourist Zone
 Geumgangsong Ecorium
 Uljin Guemgangsong Culture Center
 Hanhwa Condominium
 Camphorse
 Ul-Jin Yacht School
 Ul-jin Ocean Leports Center

Other important spots 

 Seongnyugul Cave 
 Sinsun Valley

Architecture

Historical 

 Buryeongsa Temple
 Mangyangjeong Pavilion
 Wolsongjeong Pavilion

Modern 

 Deunggisan Suspension Bridge

Economy
The Uljin Nuclear Power Plant, one of four nuclear power plants in South Korea, is located in Bugu. The plant currently has six reactors and is a top source of jobs for the county and region.

Education

High schools
Hupo High School
Jukbyeon High School
Pyeonghae Gongeob High School
Pyeonghae Jeongbo High School
Uljin High School

Middle schools
Bugu Middle School
Giseong Middle School
Hupo Middle School
Jukbyeon Middle School
Maewha Middle School
Onjeong Middle School
Pyeonghae Middle School
Pyeonghae Girl's Middle School
Uljin Middle School

Elementary schools
Bugu Elementary School
Giseong Elementary School
Hupo Elementary School
Hupo Dongbu Elementary School
Jukbyeon Elementary School
Maewha Elementary School
Noeum Elementary School
Onjeong Elementary School
Pyeonghae Elementary School
Uljin Elementary School
Uljin Nambu Elementary School
Sadong Elementary School
Samgeun Elementary School
Wolsong Elementary School

Climate
Uljin has a cooler version of a humid subtropical climate (Köppen: Cfa).

Sister cities
 Goyang, South Korea
 Yangcheon-gu, South Korea
 Seocho-gu, South Korea
 Suseong-gu, South Korea
 Dong-gu, Busan, South Korea
 Omaezaki, Shizuoka Prefecture, Japan

References

External links
County government website

 
Counties of North Gyeongsang Province